The 1990–91 FA Trophy was the twenty-second season of the FA Trophy.

First qualifying round

Ties

Replays

2nd replay

3rd replay

Second qualifying round

Ties

Replays

Third qualifying round

Ties

Replays

2nd replay

1st round
The teams that given byes to this round are Barrow, Colchester United, Barnet, Runcorn, Macclesfield Town, Kettering Town, Welling United, Yeovil Town, Sutton United, Merthyr Tydfil, Wycombe Wanderers, Cheltenham Town, Telford United, Kidderminster Harriers, Northwich Victoria, Altrincham, Stafford Rangers, Slough Town, Bath City, Gateshead, Farnborough Town, Aylesbury United, Dartford, Wokingham Town, Redbridge Forest, Billingham Synthonia, Woking, Dover Athletic, Hyde United, Leek Town and Gretna.

Ties

Replays

2nd replay

2nd round

Ties

Replays

3rd round

Ties

4th round

Ties

Semi finals

First leg

Second leg

Replay

Final

Tie

References

General
 Football Club History Database: FA Trophy 1990-91

Specific

1990–91 domestic association football cups
League
1990-91